Francis Claud Cockburn (12 April 1904 – 15 December 1981) was a British journalist. His saying "believe nothing until it has been officially denied" is widely quoted in journalistic studies, but he did not claim credit for originating it. He was the second cousin, once removed, of the novelists Alec Waugh and Evelyn Waugh. He lived at Brook Lodge, Youghal, County Cork, Ireland.

Cockburn was "a leading British Communist Party member", and by the 1940s, he was reputed to be a prominent figure in "the Comintern in Western Europe".

Early life
Cockburn was born in Peking (present-day Beijing), China, on 12 April 1904, the son of Henry Cockburn, a British Consul General, and wife Elizabeth Gordon (née Stevenson). His paternal great-grandfather was Scottish judge/biographer Henry Cockburn, Lord Cockburn. Cockburn was educated at Berkhamsted School, Berkhamstead, Hertfordshire, and Keble College, Oxford, graduating with a Bachelor of Arts. At Oxford he was part of the Hypocrites' Club.

Journalist
He became a journalist with The Times and worked as a foreign correspondent in Germany and the United States before he resigned in 1933 to start his own newsletter, The Week. It has been said that during his spell as a sub-editor on The Times, Cockburn and colleagues competed (with a small prize for the winner) to write the dullest printed headline. Cockburn only once claimed the honours, with "Small Earthquake in Chile, Not many dead". No copy of The Times featuring that headline has been located although it finally appeared decades after the recollection in Not the Times, a spoof version of the newspaper produced by several journalists at The Times in 1979 during the paper's year-long absence because of an industrial dispute.

Spanish Civil War
Under the alias Frank Pitcairn, Cockburn contributed to the British communist newspaper, the Daily Worker. In 1936, Harry Pollitt, General Secretary of the Communist Party of Great Britain, asked him to cover the Spanish Civil War. Cockburn joined the Fifth Regiment to report the war as a soldier. While in Spain, he published Reporter in Spain. According to the editor of a volume of his writings on Spain, Cockburn formed a personal relationship with Mikhail Koltsov, "then the foreign editor of Pravda and, in Cockburn's view, 'the confidant and mouthpiece and direct agent of Stalin in Spain'".

Cockburn's reporting in Spain, as "Frank Pitcairn", was heavily criticised by George Orwell in his 1938 memoir Homage to Catalonia. Orwell accused Cockburn of being under the control of Stalinist handlers and was critical of Cockburn's depiction of the Barcelona May Days in which Orwell had taken part and during which anti-Stalinist communists and anarchists were caught and executed by NKVD operatives. Specifically, to undermine anti-Stalinist factions on the Republican side, Cockburn falsely reported that the anti-Stalinist figurehead Andrés Nin, who had been tortured and executed by the NKVD, was alive and well after escaping to fascist territory.

According to writer Adam Hochschild, Cockburn functioned as Stalinist propagandist during the war "on [Communist] Party orders". In one instance, Cockburn claimed to have been an eyewitness to a battle that he totally invented. This hoax was intended to persuade the French prime minister that Francisco Franco's forces were weaker than they appeared and thus make the Republicans seem worthier candidates for help in obtaining arms. The ruse worked, and the French border was opened for a previously-stalled artillery shipment.

Opposition to appeasement
In the late 1930s, Cockburn published a private newspaper, The Week, which was highly critical of Neville Chamberlain. Cockburn maintained in the 1960s that much of the information in The Week had been leaked to him by Sir Robert Vansittart, Permanent Under-Secretary of the Foreign Office.

At the same time, Cockburn claimed that the Security Service (MI5) was spying on him because of The Week, but the British historian D. C. Watt argued that it was more likely that if anyone was spying on Cockburn, it was the Special Branch of Scotland Yard, which was less experienced in that work than MI5. Cockburn was an opponent of appeasement before the Molotov–Ribbentrop Pact. In a 1937 article in The Week, Cockburn coined the term "Cliveden set" to describe what he alleged to be an upper-class pro-German group that exercised influence behind the scenes. The Week ceased publication shortly after the war had begun.

Watt alleges that the information printed in The Week included rumours, some of which suited Moscow's interests. Watt used as an example the claim The Week made in February–March 1939 that German troops were concentrating in Klagenfurt for an invasion of Yugoslavia, which Watt states to have no basis in reality.

Postwar
In 1947, Cockburn moved to Ireland and lived at Ardmore, County Waterford. He continued to contribute to newspapers and journals, including a weekly column for The Irish Times. There he famously stated, "Wherever there is a stink in international affairs, you will find that Henry Kissinger has recently visited".

Among his novels were Beat the Devil (originally under the pseudonym James Helvick), The Horses, Ballantyne's Folly, and Jericho Road. Beat the Devil was made into a 1953 film by the director John Huston, who paid Cockburn £3,000 for the rights to the book and screenplay. Cockburn collaborated with Huston on the early drafts of the script, but the credit went to Truman Capote. The title was later used by Cockburn's son Alexander for his regular column in The Nation.

He published Bestseller, an exploration of English popular fiction, Aspects of English History (1957), The Devil's Decade (1973), his history of the 1930s and Union Power (1976).

His first volume of memoirs was published as In Time of Trouble (1956) in the United Kingdom and as A Discord of Trumpets in the United States. It was followed by Crossing the Line (1958), and A View from the West (1961). Revised, they were published by Penguin as I, Claud... in 1967. Again revised and shortened, with a new chapter, they were republished as Cockburn Sums Up shortly before he died.

He also wrote Mr. Mintoff Comes to Ireland. The book was published in 1975 but set in 1980 when Dom Mintoff was Malta's Prime Minister and leader of the Malta Labour Party. The cover description describes it as a "shrewd assessment of how a small independent nation may best stand up to the so called Great Powers".

Family
Claud Cockburn married three times: all three of his wives were also journalists.
 Hope Hale Davis:  child Claudia Cockburn Flanders (wife of Michael Flanders)
 Jean Ross (model for Christopher Isherwood's Sally Bowles of Cabaret fame):  child Sarah Caudwell Cockburn, author of detective stories
 Patricia Byron in 1940 (née Patricia Evangeline Anne Arbuthnot (17 March 1914 – 6 October 1989), daughter of Major John Bernard Arbuthnot and Olive Blake, (author of The Years of the Week and Figure of Eight): children Alexander, Andrew (husband of Leslie Cockburn), Patrick.

His granddaughters include RadioNation host Laura Flanders, ex-BBC Economics editor Stephanie Flanders, and actress Olivia Wilde.

See also
Cockburn (surname)

References

External links

 spartacus-educational.com
 freepages.genealogy.rootsweb.ancestry.com

1904 births
1981 deaths
Writers from Beijing
Cockburn family
British people of Scottish descent
British people of Irish descent
British male journalists
British Marxist journalists
Private Eye contributors
The Times people
People educated at Berkhamsted School
Alumni of Keble College, Oxford
Communist Party of Great Britain members
British expatriates in China